Nicolas Bertin (1667 in Paris – 1736) was a French painter.

A student of Jean Jouvenet, Vernansal the elder and Louis Boullongne, he won the prix de Rome in 1685 for "Construction of Noah's ark". He was admitted to the Académie royale de peinture et de sculpture in 1703.

Works 

Saint Philip baptising the eunuch of Candace, 1718 (Louvre)
Hercules delivering Prometheus.
Construction of Noah's ark, 1685
The Stoning of St Stephen, (Musée Henri Dupuis Saint-Omer)
Moses and the daughters of Jethro, (Musée Henri Dupuis Saint-Omer)
Moses and the daughters of Jethro, (Musée Lambinet Versailles) (2iem version)
Prometheus delivered by Hercules, 1703, (Louvre)
Bacchanalia, 1710–1720, (National Museum in Warsaw)
The Resurrection of Lazarus, 1720 (Musée Lambinet Versailles)
Phaeton driving the sun-chariot (Phaéton on the Chariot of Apollo), c. 1720, (Louvre)
Vertumnus and Pomona, (decoration) (musée national du château et des Trianons Versailles)
Annunciation (Loyola University Museum of Art, Chicago)

Sources 
base joconde

External links

 French Portrait Engraving

1667 births
1736 deaths
17th-century French painters
French male painters
18th-century French painters
Painters from Paris
18th-century French male artists